The 2021 Ahmad Shah Abdali 4-day Tournament was an edition of the Ahmad Shah Abdali 4-day Tournament, a first-class cricket tournament in Afghanistan that was played in November and December 2021. Band-e-Amir Region won the title for the third time, defeating Amo Region by 7 wickets in the final. Boost Region's score of 864/9 against Speen Ghar Region was the highest score since the Ahmad Shah Abdali 4-day Tournament gained first-class status, and was the 14th highest total in any first-class cricket.

Round-robin

Points table

 Advanced to the final

Fixtures

Final

References

External links
 Series home at ESPN Cricinfo

Afghan domestic cricket competitions
Ahmad Shah Abdali 4-day Tournament
Ahmad Shah Abdali 4-day Tournament